Feroze Khan (born 11 July 1990) is a Pakistani actor, model and video jockey. who works in Urdu television. He made his acting debut with Bikhra Mera Naseeb as Harib in 2014 and got breakthrough after portraying Adeel in Hum TV's romantic Gul-e-Rana in 2015. Khan received wider popularity after portraying Mir Hadi in Khaani 2017-18. His other notable works include Ishqiya and Khuda Aur Muhabbat 3.

In 2022, he played Mustajab Ahmed in Aye Musht-E-Khaak and was seen playing Basit Salman in ARY Digital's Habs (2022-23).

Early life and family
Khan was born on 11 July 1990, in Quetta, Balochistan in Pakistan into a Pashtun family. He has five siblings, including actress Humaima Malick and singer-songwriter Dua Malik.

In 2018, Khan married Syeda Alizey Fatima Raza in an arranged marriage. On the 3 May 2019, they had a son named Mohammad Sultan Khan. 

In 2020 there was speculation that Khan and his wife had parted ways. None spoke up about this until Khan’s wife posted a family photo, showing her with Khan and their son, on Instagram with the caption “Home” thus ending the divorce rumours. On 14 February 2022, Khan’s wife gave birth to their second child whom they named Fatima Khan.

In September 2022, there were reports of Khan going to court in Karachi. A couple of days later on the 21 September, Khan posted a statement on social media revealing that he and his wife had parted ways, and that their divorce was finalised on the 3 September 2022.

Career

Early work (2014–2017) 
Khan began his career as a VJ on ARY Musik and then later on became a model. He made his acting debut in 2014 with television series, Bikhra Mera Naseeb as Harib. He then went on to play Aazer in ARY Digital’s romantic thriller Chup Raho, it was criticised due to its unauthentic, flawed dramatisation and misleading depiction. In 2015, Khan starred as Humayun in the romantic series Tumse Mil Kay but these failed to propel his career forward.

The same year, he starred as Adeel Ahmed in Hum TV's Drama romance Gul-e-Rana, a drama based on a novel, titled Hasti Ke Ahang, by Samra Bukhari alongside Sajal Aly. It was known as one of the popular series during its run, but received negative reviews and has been criticized for its misogynistic, sexist and regressive approach though khan received a nomination for Best Actor - popular in Hum Awards. 

In 2016 Khan made his Lollywood debut in Anjum Shahzad's drama film Zindagi Kitni Haseen Hay opposite Sajal Ali which was released on (Eid ul Adha) 13 September 2016 opened to mixed reviews from critics. 

In 2017, he starred as Arish in Hum TV's drama Woh Aik Pal alongside Ayesha Khan and debutante Ramsha Khan. It received mixed reviews from critics wrote, "what took the makers so long to wrap it up, because Woh Aik Pal was being stretched to the extremes without a need" further wrote, It could not hold its audience because the script lost its essence midway and performances deteriorated".

Breakthrough and success (2017–present) 

In the same year, Khan starred as Mir Hadi, the son of a rising politician who, out of anger, gunned down a university student, alongside Sana Javed in Geo Entertainment's drama Khaani which is loosely based on the real life murder of Shahzeb Khan. The series was a commercial success and earned Khan Best TV Actor - Viewer's choice at Lux Style Awards. In 2018, Khan appeared as Romeo Raja in the romantic, comedy Romeo Weds Heer in which he reunited with Sana Javed. It received mixed reviews and average ratings in the initial episodes but towards February the TRP began falling down and had a terrible audience reception, and was no longer in the top 10. By the last episode, the show lost its viewership; both on TV, and YouTube. 

In 2019, he played Armaan Salman in Dil Kiya Karay opposite Yumna Zaidi which didn't perform well in the ratings. 

In 2020, Khan starred, as Hamza Khalid, in ARY Digital’s romantic Ishqiya opposite Hania Aamir and Ramsha Khan. The show received mixed reviews from critics, Khan received Best Actor (Popular) at 2nd Pakistan International Screen Awards. In that same year Khan declared that he would be quitting the showbiz industry saying that he would “only act and provide [his] services for the teaching of Islam...” In late December Khan rejoined the showbiz industry after claiming that his Sheikh ordered him not to leave.

In 2021, Khan starred as Fahad in the highly anticipated drama, Khuda Aur Muhabbat 3 alongside Iqra Aziz which premiered on Geo Entertainment, and ended up becoming the most watched Pakistani television series on YouTube but received mixed to negative reviews from critics, the story for being problematic.

Khan then went on to play Mustajab Ahmed, a narcissist Atheist who falls in love with a religious Muslim woman, in Aye Musht-e-Khaak alongside Sana Javed. Since mid 2022, Khan has been portraying Basit, an adult suffering the consequences of his childhood trauma and trying to navigate through life and relationships, in ARY Digital’s drama Habs opposite Ushna Shah.

On 28th October, Khan announced on his Instagram story that he had launched his YouTube channel titled “FK”. On 3 November Khan released his single titled “Maangain Sabki Khairain”.

Controversies 
Khan's ex wife, Syeda Aliza stated in an Instagram post that their “marriage was filled with emotional and physical abuse as well as infidelity”.  She stated the mental and physical well being of her and her children are the reason for their divorce.  The two are currently involved in a custody battle. 

Following widespread criticism, Khan published a statement refuting the claims made against him with a long note on Instagram. Since the allegations broke, some Pakistani celebrities have spoken out in Aliza's favour including his co-stars Iqra Aziz and Ushna Shah. Thus, demanding ban on khan.

In November 2022, Lux Style Awards received massive backlash after they rolled out nominations for its 21st edition, where Khan was nominated for Best TV Actor category for drama Khuda Aur Mohabbat 3. LSA stated ”submissions are received from artists and channels as part of an open call for entries for consideration in the awards. All shortlisted nominations for the Viewer’s Choice Category are a result of exclusive viewer voting without any intervention by the Awards.” For the unversed, the backlash has further intensified after the Khaani actor won the category for the same. The award was received by his sister Humaima Malick.

In January 2023, Muneeb Butt filed a complaint against Feroze for disclosing the personal number of his spouse, Aiman Khan.

Filmography

Films

Television

Other appearance

Accolades

References

External links

 

1990 births
Living people
Pakistani male models
Pakistani male television actors
21st-century Pakistani male actors
People from Quetta
Pakistani Muslims